The Avon Maitland District School Board (known as English-language Public District School Board No. 8 prior to 1999) administers public school education in Huron and Perth Counties, including the city of Stratford, in southern Ontario.

Secondary school enrollment and Fraser Institute provincial rankings are as follows:

Roman Catholic education in the area is administered by the Huron Perth Catholic District School Board.

See also
List of school districts in Ontario
List of high schools in Ontario

References

School districts in Ontario
Education in Perth County, Ontario
Education in Huron County, Ontario